Melanerpes is a genus of woodpeckers of the family Picidae found in the New World.  The 24 members of the genus are mostly colourful birds, conspicuously barred in black and white, with some red and yellow.

Taxonomy
The genus Melanerpes was introduced by the English ornithologist William John Swainson in 1832 to accommodate the red-headed woodpecker (Melanerpes erythrocephalus). The generic name combines the Ancient Greek melas meaning "black" with herpēs meaning "creeper". The genus forms part of the large tribe Melanerpini, which also includes the North American sapsuckers in the genus Sphyrapicus and the monotypic genus Xiphidiopicus containing only the Cuban green woodpecker (Xiphidiopicus percussus).

Characteristics
Members of Melanerpes are small to medium-sized woodpeckers found exclusively in the New World. Some are West Indian endemics, and include species from Hispaniola, Puerto Rico, Jamaica and Guadeloupe; one subspecies, the Grand Bahama West Indian woodpecker (M. superciliaris bahamensis) became extinct in the 1950s. The majority of the species are from Central and South America. Most species are boldly marked in black and white, with some areas of red and yellow. The beaks are long and pointed, and sometimes curved. The sexes differ in many species, both in colour and in size.

Some species such as the acorn woodpecker and the yellow-tufted woodpecker are sociable, foraging in groups, communicating vocally and nesting communally. These have complex breeding systems including some non-breeding adult helpers assisting in rearing the young. Like other woodpeckers, insects form a large part of the diet, being caught on the wing in some species, but fruit is also eaten in large quantities and some species consume sap. They all nest in holes that they excavate in trees, and the red-crowned woodpecker and the Hoffmann's woodpecker are unusual in that they sometimes enter their holes backwards.

Species
The genus includes 25 species:

Melanerpes shawi (extinct: Late Pleistocene)

References

External links 

  Melanerpes

 
Dendropicini
Bird genera

Taxa named by William John Swainson